Anton Anatolyevich Arkhipov (born 4 November 1985) is a former Russian footballer.

Club career

Arkhipov is a graduate of the Chertanovo Education Center.

He made his Russian Premier League debut for FC Shinnik Yaroslavl on 17 October 2004 in a game against FC Spartak Moscow.

Arkhipov joined Rotor Volgograd on 2 July 2013. In October 2013, Arkhipov was sacked by Rotor Volgograd for "appearing at work under the influence of alcohol." He made 18 appearances for Rotor and scored 3 goals.

Honours

Khimki
Russian First Division: 2006

References

External links
  Player profile on the official Russian Premier League website

1985 births
Footballers from Moscow
Living people
Russian footballers
Russian expatriate footballers
FC Shinnik Yaroslavl players
FC Saturn Ramenskoye players
FC Tom Tomsk players
FC Khimki players
FC Chernomorets Novorossiysk players
Hapoel Ramat Gan F.C. players
Hapoel Bnei Lod F.C. players
FC Rotor Volgograd players
Russian Premier League players
Israeli Premier League players
Liga Leumit players
Russian expatriate sportspeople in Israel
Expatriate footballers in Israel
Association football forwards
FC Chertanovo Moscow players
FC Khimik Dzerzhinsk players
FC Olimp-Dolgoprudny players
FC Spartak Nizhny Novgorod players